The lempira (sign: L, ISO 4217 code: HNL;) is the currency of Honduras. It is subdivided into 100 centavos.

Etymology 
The lempira was named after the 16th-century cacique Lempira, a ruler of the indigenous Lenca people, who is renowned in Honduran folklore for leading the local native resistance against the  Spanish conquistador forces. He is a national hero and is honored on both the 1 lempira note and the 20 and 50 centavos coins.

History
The lempira was introduced in 1931, replacing the peso at par. In the late 1980s, the exchange rate was two lempiras to the United States dollar (the 20-centavos coin is called a daime as it was worth the same as a U.S. dime). As of April 4, 2022, the lempira was quoted at 24.40 HNL to US$1.

Coins

In 1931, coins were introduced in denominations of 5, 20 & 50 centavos, and 1 lempira. One, 2 and 10 centavos coins were added in 1935, 1939 and 1932, respectively. The silver 1 lempira coins ceased production in 1937, with the other silver coins (20 & 50 centavos) replaced by cupro-nickel in 1967. The 1 and 2 centavos coins were last minted in 1998 and 1974, respectively.

Coins currently in circulation are
5 centavos
10 centavos
20 centavos
50 centavos

Banknotes
The Bank of Honduras and the Banco Atlantida issued the first lempira banknotes in 1932. They were in denominations of 1, 2, 5, 10 and 20 lempiras. The Central Bank of Honduras took over production of paper money in 1950, introducing 50 and 100 lempiras notes in 1950, followed by the 500-lempiras note in 1995.

In January, 2010, a new 20-lempira note was introduced to market made by a polymer base, 60 million notes were issued.

In celebration of the Bicentennial anniversary of Honduras's independence, a new 200 lempira bill was issued. It features 2  scarlet macaws, the national bird of Honduras.

Banknotes in circulation are

Exchange rates

See also
 Economy of Honduras

References

External links
 The banknotes of Honduras 

Currencies of Honduras
Currencies of Central America
Currencies introduced in 1931
Currency symbols